You Never Can Tell may refer to:

 You Never Can Tell (play), an 1899 play by G. Bernard Shaw
 "You Never Can Tell" (song), a 1964 song by Chuck Berry
 You Never Can Tell (1920 film), a romantic comedy starring Jack Mulhall and Bebe Daniels
 You Never Can Tell (1951 film), a comedy starring Dick Powell